Connexion is a variant spelling of connection and may refer to:

Technology and Internet
 Connexion by Boeing, an in-flight online connectivity service
 Connexions (now called OpenStax CNX), a repository of open educational resources started at Rice University
 Connexions (website), a website for the movements for social change in Canada

Religion
 Connexionalism, the theological understanding and foundation of Methodist ecclesiastical polity

Other uses
 The Connexion, a monthly English-language newspaper for English-speakers in France
 Connexion (game show), a Tamil celebrity game show on Vijay TV in India
 "Connexion", a track on Late Night Tales: Matt Helders DJ mix album
 Connexions (agency), a support service in the United Kingdom
 ConneXions Leadership Academy, a middle school in Baltimore, Maryland

See also
 Connection (disambiguation)
 Connexxion, a transport company in the Netherlands
 Connexionsbuses, a Yorkshire bus operator